is a passenger railway station in located in the city of  Suzuka,  Mie Prefecture, Japan, operated by the private railway operator Kintetsu Railway.

Lines
Tsuzumigaura Station is served by the Nagoya Line, and is located 54.1 rail kilometers from the starting point of the line at Kintetsu Nagoya Station.

Station layout
The station was consists of two opposed side platforms, connected by a footbridge. The station is unattended.

Platforms

Adjacent stations

History
It was renamed to its present name on October 1, 1922. The Ise Railway became the Sangu Express Electric Railway’s Ise Line on September 15, 1936, and was renamed the Nagoya Line on December 7, 1938. After merging with Osaka Electric Kido on March 15, 1941, the line became the Kansai Express Railway's Nagoya Line. This line was merged with the Nankai Electric Railway on June 1, 1944 to form Kintetsu.

Passenger statistics
In fiscal 2019, the station was used by an average of 644 passengers daily (boarding passengers only).

Surrounding area
Koyasu Kannon Temple
Tsuzumigaura beach
Suzuka City Kogaura Junior High School

See also
List of railway stations in Japan

References

External links

 Kintetsu: Tsuzumigaura Station

Railway stations in Japan opened in 1915
Railway stations in Mie Prefecture
Stations of Kintetsu Railway
Suzuka, Mie